Distinguishing Features is a German silent crime film directed by Edmund Heuberger. It was shot at the Staaken Studios in Berlin. The film's sets were designed by Gustav A. Knauer and Willy Schiller.

Cast
In alphabetical order

References

Bibliography

External links

1929 films
Films of the Weimar Republic
German silent feature films
Films directed by Edmund Heuberger
German black-and-white films
Films shot at Staaken Studios
1929 crime films
German crime films
1920s German films